Pitcairnia mirandae is a plant species in the genus Pitcairnia. This species is endemic to Mexico.

References

mirandae
Flora of Mexico